Neoendorphins are a group of endogenous opioid peptides derived from the proteolytic cleavage of prodynorphin. They include α-neoendorphin and β-neoendorphin. The α-neoendorphin is present in greater amounts in the brain than β-neoendorphin. Both are products of the dynorphin gene, which also expresses dynorphin A,  dynorphin A-(1-8), and dynorphin B. These opioid neurotransmitters are especially active in  Central Nervous System receptors, whose primary function is pain sensation. These peptides all have the consensus amino acid sequence of Try-Gly-Gly-Phe-Met (met-enkephalin) or Tyr-Gly-Gly-Phe-Leu ( leu-enkephalin). Binding of neoendorphins to opioid receptors (OPR), in the dorsal root ganglion (DRG) neurons results in the reduction of time of calcium-dependent action potential. The α-neoendorphins bind OPRD1(delta),  OPRK1(kappa), and  OPRM1 (mu) and β-neoendorphin bind OPRK1.

Types

See also
 Endorphin

References

Opioid peptides